Leopold von Ubisch (1886–1965) was a German paleontologist who in 1954 surgically removed the nucleus from sea urchin eggs, to confirm an 1899 experiment by Theodor Boveri.

He was an early supporter of the theory of continental drift.

Life

Von Ubisch was a professor of zoology at the University of Münster from 1927 to 1935, when he was fired because his mother was Jewish. In 1945 he declined an offer to return to his chair.

He had one sister, Gerta, who was born in Metz on 3 October 1882, and died in 1965. She lectured on genetics in Heidelberg.

References

1886 births
1965 deaths
German paleontologists
20th-century German zoologists
Academic staff of the University of Münster